Dick Bakker (born 23 May 1947 in Blaricum) is a Dutch composer, conductor and music producer. He succeeded Rogier van Otterloo as conductor of the Metropole Orkest, serving between 1991 and 2005.

Bakker composed the winning Eurovision Song Contest entry of 1975 for Teach-In. He has remained an associate with the Eurovision Song Contest and the Nationaal Songfestival, composing the Dutch entry for the 1982 Event sung by Bill van Dijk. He conducted three Dutch Eurovision entries, in 1996, 1997 and 1998. Bakker is a strong supporter of an orchestra's return to the contest.

Bakker has worked as a studio engineer and arranger for Shocking Blue (on Venus), Rudi Carrell and Paloma Blanca.

See also
 List of Eurovision Song Contest winners
 Metropole Orkest
 Netherlands in the Eurovision Song Contest

References

External links
 
 Dick Bakker.nl

1947 births
People from Blaricum
Living people
Eurovision Song Contest conductors
Eurovision Song Contest winners
Dutch male songwriters
Dutch conductors (music)
Male conductors (music)
Dutch record producers
21st-century conductors (music)
21st-century male musicians
Dutch Swing College Band members